Potassium hypochlorite (chemical formula KClO) is the potassium salt of hypochlorous acid.  It is used in variable concentrations, often diluted in water solution.  It has a light grey color and a strong chlorine smell.  It can be used as a disinfectant.

Preparation
Potassium hypochlorite is produced by the reaction of chlorine with a solution of potassium hydroxide:
Cl2 + 2 KOH → KCl + KClO + H2O

This is the traditional method, first used by Claude Louis Berthollet in 1789.

Another production method is electrolysis of potassium chloride solution.
With both methods, the reaction mixture must be kept cold to prevent formation of potassium chlorate.

Uses
Potassium hypochlorite is used for sanitizing surfaces as well as disinfecting drinking water. Because its degradation leaves behind potassium chloride rather than sodium chloride, its use has been promoted in agriculture, where addition of potassium to soil is desired.

History
Potassium hypochlorite was first produced in 1789 by Claude Louis Berthollet in his laboratory located in Javel in Paris, France, by passing chlorine gas through a solution of potash lye. The resulting liquid, known as "Eau de Javel" ("Javel water"), was a weak solution of potassium hypochlorite. Due to production difficulties, the product was then modified using sodium instead of potassium, giving rise to sodium hypochlorite, widely used today as a disinfectant.

Safety and toxicology
Like sodium hypochlorite, potassium hypochlorite is an irritant. It can cause severe damage on contact with the skin, eyes, and mucous membranes. Inhalation of a mist of KClO can cause bronchial irritation, difficulty breathing, and in severe cases pulmonary edema. Ingestion of strong concentrations can be lethal.

Potassium hypochlorite is not considered a fire or explosive hazard by itself. However, it can react explosively with numerous chemicals, including urea, ammonium salts, methanol, acetylene, and many organic compounds. Heating and acidification can produce toxic chlorine gas.

References

Potassium compounds
Hypochlorites
Antiseptics
Disinfectants
Oxidizing agents